George Browell (21 November 1884 – 1951) was an English professional footballer who played as a wing half.

References

1884 births
1951 deaths
Footballers from Tyne and Wear
English footballers
Association football wing halves
West Stanley F.C. players
Hull City A.F.C. players
Grimsby Town F.C. players
English Football League players